"Circles" is an essay by Ralph Waldo Emerson, first published in 1841. 

The essay consists of a philosophical view of the vast array of circles one may find throughout nature.  In the opening line of the essay Emerson states "The eye is the first circle; the horizon which it forms is the second; and throughout nature this primary figure is repeated without end".

See also
 Oikeiôsis

References

External links
 Text of Circles
  Ralph Waldo Emerson

Essays by Ralph Waldo Emerson
1841 essays